The 2006 season was Daegu F.C.'s 4th season in South Korea's K-League.

Season Summary

Lee Sang-il would be made captain for 2006, which would be his final year with the club before moving to the Chunnam Dragons.  As a foundation player, Lee had been with the club since 2003, and would go on to make 98 appearances in total (all competitions) for Daegu FC by the conclusion of the 2006 season. Key new players for the club would include Brazilians Dinei and Eduardo Marques, as well as Korean draftee Jang Nam-Seok who would play as a forward for the club.  Another important recruit for the club was goalkeeper Baek Min-cheol, who was getting little game time with FC Seoul.

Prior to the start of the K-League season, Daegu participated in the 2006 edition of the Tongyeong Cup.  The Tongyeong Cup is a four team invitational tournament held in Tongyeong, South Korea.  As well as Daegu and fellow K-League club Incheon United, A-League side Queensland Roar and Beijing Guo'an were also part of the tournament.  After beating both Incheon and Beijing, Daegu drew 0–0 with Queensland, winning the Tongyeong Cup and thus the first piece of silverware for Daegu's trophy cabinet.

Unfortunately, Daegu's late 2005 season and 2006 Tongyeong Cup form did not continue into the 2006 K-League season proper, and the club again had a disappointing first stage. Winning only two games, they were placed in a share of eleventh, alongside Gwangju and debutant club Gyeongnam FC. However, as in 2005, the club's performance improved for the second stage, winning six games, and losing four, with three draws. This saw the club place fourth in the second stage and seventh overall. In contrast to the previous two seasons, offensively, the club struggled with goals being spread across a number of players, with no single standout player.

In between the first and second stages of the K-League season, the club participated in the Samsung Hauzen Cup.  The club's performances in this competition matched that of their performance in the first stage of the K-League, and Daegu only placed 13th out of 14 teams.  A lack of penetration did not help, and only Jang Nam-Seok, in his first season for the club, featured in the leading goal scorers table.  Jang was the top scorer in the FA Cup, with 3 goals (including two in a 6-0 demolition of Chungang University, helping the club to the quarterfinals.  However, they lost (again) to the Chunnam Dragons.

Following completion of the 2006 season, Park Jong-Hwan stepped down as manager after four years with the club.  On 1 December 2006, Byun Byung-Joo was appointed manager.  A former representative player for the Republic of Korea, Byun had no previous K-League management experience prior to his appointment as Daegu FC's manager.

In other events during 2006:
On 1 May, Choi Jong-Joon was elected to the position of representative director.
On 20 September, Kim Bum-Il (Daegu mayor) was elected to the position of chairman.
On 9 November, a supplier's sponsorship agreement was reached with Lotto.

Squad

Player In/Out

In

Out

Statistics

|}

Tongyeong Cup

Matches

Standings 

Awards
2006 Tongyeong Cup MVP, Top Scorer: Lee Sang-Il (2 Goals)

K-League

Standings

Korean FA Cup

Matches

Awards
2006 Korean FA Cup Top Scorer: Jang Nam-Seok (3 Goals)

Samsung Hauzen Cup

Standings

See also
Daegu FC

References

External links
Daegu FC Official website  

Daegu FC seasons
Daegu FC